"In God We Trust" is the official motto of the United States of America and of the U.S. state of Florida.

In God We Trust may also refer to:

Film and television 
 In God We Tru$t, a 1980 film starring Marty Feldman and Peter Boyle
 In God We Trust (2013 film), a documentary
 "In God We Trust" (Arrested Development), an episode of Arrested Development
 "In God We Trust" (The West Wing), an episode of The West Wing
 In God We Trust, a short film by Jason Reitman

Music 
 In God We Trust (Brand Nubian album) (1993)
 In God We Trust (Mermen album) (2010)
 In God We Trust (Stryper album) (1988)
 In God We Trust, Inc., a 1981 EP by the Dead Kennedys

Other uses
 In God We Trust (play), a 2005 play by Avaes Mohammad

See also
 In God We Trust: All Others Pay Cash, a 1966 book by Jean Shepherd